The history of the taka, also known as the tanka or tangka, refers to one of the major historical currencies of Asia, particularly in the Indian subcontinent and Tibet. It was introduced in the 14th century and became a currency of the Silk Road. Its history is intertwined with the medieval Islamic history and culture of the Indian subcontinent.

In modern times, the Bangladeshi taka is considered a legacy of the historical taka because Bengal was the stronghold of the currency. It was inscribed in numerous languages across different regions, including in Sanskrit, Arabic, Persian, Hindustani, Bengali, Nepali, Tibetan and Mandarin.

Etymology

According to The American Heritage Dictionary of the English Language and Banglapedia, the word taka came from the Sanskrit word tankah.

Introduction in North India
The imperial tanka (also called Sultani tanka) was officially introduced by the monetary reforms of Muhammad bin Tughluq, the emperor of the Delhi Sultanate, in 1329. It was modeled as representative money, a concept pioneered as paper money by the Mongols in China and Persia. The tanka was minted in copper and brass. Its value was exchanged with gold and silver reserves in the imperial treasury. The currency was introduced due to the shortage of metals. Over time, the tanka was minted in silver. However, chaos followed its launch in the 14th century, leading to the collapse of the Tughluq dynasty. The Tughluqs were succeeded by numerous regional states, notably the Bengal Sultanate, the Bahmani Sultanate and the Gujarat Sultanate. These kingdoms continued to mint the new currency in the name of their own rulers. Even much later under the early modern Mughal Empire, regional currencies were still referred to as tanka/tangka/taka.

Arakan
The Bengal tanka was widely circulated in the Kingdom of Mrauk U (now in Myanmar) in the 16th and 17th centuries, when it was a vassal state of the Bengal Sultanate.

Bangladesh
The Bangladeshi taka is the currency of modern Bangladesh. It was officially introduced in 1972 by the Bangladesh Bank following the end of the Bangladesh Liberation War and is produced by Bangladesh's Security Printing Corporation. The Bangladeshi taka carries the symbols ৳ and Tk.

Bengal
The taka was traditionally equal to one silver rupee in Islamic Bengal. In 1338, Ibn Battuta noticed that the silver taka was the most popular currency in the region instead of the Islamic dinar. In 1415, members of Admiral Zheng He's entourage also noticed the dominance of the taka. The currency was the most important symbol of sovereignty for the Sultan of Bengal. The Sultanate of Bengal established at least 27 mints in provincial capitals across the kingdom.

The taka continued to be issued in Mughal Bengal, which inherited the sultanate's legacy. As Bengal became more prosperous and integrated into the world economy under Mughal rule, the taka replaced shell currency in rural areas and became the standardized legal tender. It was also used in commerce with the Dutch East India Company, the French East India Company, the Danish East India Company and the British East India Company.

East India
In 14th-century Odisha, epigraphic records use terms such as vendi-tanka (alloyed silver) and sasukani-tanka (bullion). The tanka spread to the region from the Delhi Sultanate.

Nepal
The tanka standard was introduced in the prosperous Himalayan Kathmandu Valley (Nepal proper) in the 16th century. It was modeled on the currency of Delhi, Bengal and the Mughal Empire. The Nepalese tanka was a debased silver coin struck in 10 g. weight with minor denominations of  1⁄4,  1⁄32,  1⁄123,  1⁄512. It was introduced by King Indra Simha.

Pakistan
Until 1971, the present-day Pakistani rupee had bilingual inscriptions in Urdu and Bengali, and was called both the rupee and taka. The Bengali Language Movement played a decisive role in ensuring the recognition of the taka in East Pakistan.

South India
The tanka was widely minted in the Deccan, including the Deccan sultanates and Mughal provinces. In the Berar Sultanate and Berar Subah, one Tanka-i-Barari was equal to eight Delhi tankas.

Tibet
The Tibetan tangka was an official currency of Tibet for three centuries. It was introduced by Lhasa Newar merchants from Nepal in the 16th century. The merchants used Nepalese tanka on the Silk Road. The Tibetan government began to mint the tangka in the 18th century. The first Tibetan tangka was minted in 1763/64. China's Qing dynasty, Tibet's suzerain, established mints in the region in 1792. The Sino-Tibetan tangka carried Chinese language inscriptions.

Banknotes were issued between 1912 and 1941 in denominations of 5, 10, 15, 25 and 50 tangka.

West India
In the 15th century, the Gujarat Sultanate, on the west coast of the Indian subcontinent, began to mint silver tanka. It was a symbol of sovereignty for the Muzaffarid dynasty of Gujarat.

See also
History of the rupee
History of Chinese currency
Denga
Tenge

References

History of money
Medieval currencies
Silk Road numismatics